TheatreWorks (Silicon Valley) is a non-profit, professional theater company based in Palo Alto, California.  Since 2000, TheatreWorks has been dedicated to the development of scores of new plays and musicals, earning national recognition and acclaim for the company and their New Works Festival.

2002 Festival

2003 Festival

2004 Festival

2006 Festival

2007 Festival

2008 Festival

2009 Festival

2010 Festival

2011 Festival

2012 Festival

2013 Festival

2014 Festival

2015 Festival

2016 Festival

2017 Festival

2018 Festival

League of Resident Theatres
Lists of plays
Theatre companies in California